White Pines is an unincorporated community in Calaveras County, California. It lies at an elevation of 3907 feet (1191 m). In the 1940s, White Pines was a lumber camp. A post office operated here from 1940 to 1975.

References

External links

Unincorporated communities in California
Unincorporated communities in Calaveras County, California